Old City Hall is a historic city hall located at Williamsport, Pennsylvania.  It was built in 1894, and is a four-story building of yellow brick trimmed in stone, with molded brick ornamentation and terra cotta columns.  It is in an eclectic Late Victorian / Romanesque Revival-style.  It features two towers: a large rectangular tower and a smaller octagonal tower.

The building was added to the National Register of Historic Places in 1976 as the Williamsport City Hall.

See also

United States Post Office (Williamsport, Pennsylvania) – the current City Hall
National Register of Historic Places listings in Lycoming County, Pennsylvania

References

External links

Buildings and structures in Williamsport, Pennsylvania
City and town halls on the National Register of Historic Places in Pennsylvania
Romanesque Revival architecture in Pennsylvania
Former seats of local government
Government buildings completed in 1894
National Register of Historic Places in Lycoming County, Pennsylvania
City and town halls in Pennsylvania